Gugerdchi (also Romanized as Gūgerdchī) is a village in Chaman Rural District, Takht-e Soleyman District, Takab County, West Azerbaijan Province, Iran. As of the 2006 census, its population was 191, in 50 families.

References 

Populated places in Takab County